Robert L. Sanders (December 20, 1961) is an American politician serving as a member of the Mississippi House of Representatives from the 29th district. He assumed office on November 3, 2021.

Early life and education 
Sanders was born in Shaw, Mississippi in 1961. He earned a Bachelor of Science degree in physical education from Mississippi Valley State University.

Career 
Sanders served as chief of police of the Mississippi Valley State University Police Department and was an officer in the Shaw Police Department. He was also an internal affairs investigator with the Mississippi Department of Corrections. He later served as sergeant-at-arms for the Mississippi State Senate from 2000 to 2004. He was elected to the Mississippi House of Representatives in a November 2021 special election, succeeding Abe M. Hudson Jr.

References 

Living people
1961 births
Mississippi Valley State University alumni
People from Cleveland, Mississippi
Democratic Party members of the Mississippi House of Representatives
African-American state legislators in Mississippi